Qaleh Now-e Khaleseh (also Romanized as Qal‘eh Now-e Khāleṣeh; also known as Qal‘eh Now, Qal‘eh Now-e Ghār, and Qal‘eh-ye Nowghār) is a village in Qaleh Now Rural District of Qaleh Now District of Ray County, Tehran province, Iran. The village is the seat of the district, established on 16 September 2012, and of Qaleh Now Rural District.

At the 2006 National Census, its population was 4,718 in 1,195 households, when it was in Kahrizak District. The following census in 2011 counted 5,289 people in 1,476 households. The latest census in 2016 showed a population of 5,352 people in 1,584 households, by which time it was in Qaleh Now District.

References 

Ray County, Iran

Populated places in Tehran Province

Populated places in Ray County, Iran